Chelodina steindachneri, commonly known as the dinner-plate turtle, Steindachner's turtle and or Steindachner's flat-shell turtle, is a species of turtle in the family Chelidae. The species is the least known of the Australian turtles and also one of the smallest members of the long-necked turtles of the genus Chelodina. It is a member of the subgenus Chelodina making it closely related to the Chelodina longicollis group of species.

Description and types

Etymology
The specific name, steindachneri, is in honor of Austrian herpetologist Franz Steindachner.

Geographic range
C. steindachneri is endemic to the state of Western Australia in Australia.

Habitat
The preferred natural habitats of C. steindachneri are freshwater rivers and freshwater swamps.

References

Further reading
Cogger HG (2014). Reptiles and Amphibians of Australia, Seventh Edition. Clayton, Victoria, Australia: CSIRO Publishing. xxx + 1,o33 pp. .Grossmann P, Grossmann W (1989). "Das Portrait: Chelodina steindachneri SIEBENROCK ". Sauria 11 (2): 1–2. (in German).
Wilson, Steve; Swan, Gerry (2013). A Complete Guide to Reptiles of Australia, Fourth Edition''. Sydney: New Holland Publishers. 522 pp. .

Chelodina
Turtles of Australia
Reptiles described in 1914